The Ship-Submarine Recycling Program (SRP) is the process that the United States Navy uses to dispose of decommissioned nuclear vessels.  SRP takes place only at the Puget Sound Naval Shipyard (PSNS) in Bremerton, Washington, but the preparations can begin elsewhere.

Program overview

Defueling and decommissioning 

Before SRP can begin, the vessel's nuclear fuel must be removed, and defueling usually coincides with decommissioning. Until the fuel is removed, the vessel is referred to as "USS Name," but afterward, the "USS" prefix is dropped and it is referred to as "ex-Name." Reusable equipment is removed at the same time as the fuel.

Spent fuel storage 

Hull salvage 

At PSNS, the SRP proper begins. The salvage workers cut the submarine into three or four pieces: the aft section, the reactor compartment, the missile compartment if one exists, and the forward section. Missile compartments are dismantled according to the provisions of the Strategic Arms Reductions Treaty.

Until 1991, the forward and aft sections of the submarines were rejoined and placed in floating storage. Various proposals for disposal of those hulls were considered, including sinking them at sea, but none proved economically practical. Some submarines built prior to the 1978 banning of polychlorinated biphenyl products (PCBs) had the chemicals on board, which are considered hazardous materials by the Environmental Protection Agency and United States Coast Guard, requiring their removal. Since then, and to help reduce costs, the remaining submarine sections are recycled, returning reusable materials to production. In the process of submarine recycling, all hazardous and toxic wastes are identified and removed, and reusable equipment is removed and put into inventory. Scrap metals and all other materials are sold to private companies or reused. The overall process is not profitable, but does provide some cost relief. Disposal of submarines by the SRP costs the Navy US$25–50 million per submarine.

Reactor vessel disposal 

Once the de-fueled reactor compartment is removed, it is sealed at both ends and shipped by barge and multiple-wheel high-capacity trailers to the Department of Energy's Hanford Nuclear Reservation in Washington state, where they are currently, kept in open dry storage and slated to be eventually buried. Russian submarine reactor compartments are stored in similar fashion at Sayda-Guba (Sayda Bay) in northwestern Russia and Chazhma Bay near Vladivostok. The burial trenches have been evaluated to be secure for at least 600 years before the first pinhole penetration of some lead containment areas of the reactor compartment packages occurs, and several thousand years before leakage becomes possible.

Prior disposal methods 

In 1959 the US Navy removed a nuclear reactor from the submarine  and replaced it with a new type.
In 1972, the London Dumping Convention restricted ocean disposal of radioactive waste and in 1993, ocean disposal of radioactive waste was completely banned. The US Navy began a study on scrapping nuclear submarines; two years later shallow land burial of reactor compartments was selected as the most suitable option.

In 1990,  was the first US nuclear-powered submarine to be scrapped.

Future salvage work 

The last of the initial "41 for Freedom" fleet ballistic missile (FBM) submarines, was decommissioned in 2002. Additionally, a handful of nuclear-powered cruisers have entered the program, and their dismantling is ongoing. The first aircraft carrier due for decommissioning that would enter the SRP is planned to be , which was withdrawn in 2013. Unlike the disposal of other nuclear powered surface ships, all of which have been recycled at the Puget Sound Naval Shipyard and Intermediate Maintenance Facility, the Navy is looking at other, commercial or private sector options for Enterprise in an effort to reduce both the cost of the work and the time taken to dismantle such a large vessel, as well as negating the difficulty of towing the hulk all the way from Newport News, where it is stored, to Puget Sound.

In December 2020, it was announced that a further nine Los Angeles-class attack submarines, two  guided missile submarines, and the aircraft carrier  would be decommissioned and enter the recycling program by 2026. Hulls waiting or already processed by the recycling program are listed below.

Lists of vessels by type

Aircraft carriers

Cruisers 

† A dagger after a completion date indicates that portions of the hull were preserved as memorials.  See the individual articles for details.

(note) ex-Long Beach has been partially dismantled and remains moored in Puget Sound Naval Shipyard in 2018.

Attack submarines 

Some of these submarines (the George Washington class) were fleet ballistic missile boats for the vast majority of their careers. However, they were briefly converted to SSNs before decommissioning and arrival at PSNS, and so are listed under that designation here. The nuclear-powered research submersible NR-1 is also included in this list.

† A dagger after a completion date indicates that portions of the hull were preserved as memorials.  See the individual articles for details.

‡ Date given for ex-Parche is official date used to secure FY2004 funding; work did not begin until 19 October.

 (SSN-701) is currently undergoing conversion to a moored training ship at Norfolk Naval Shipyard.  (SSN-711) will be converted after decommissioning.

Ballistic missile submarines 
Some of these submarines (the Lafayette class) were fleet ballistic missile boats for the vast majority of their careers. However, they were converted to SSNs for use as moored training platforms and are not currently scheduled for recycling.

† A dagger after a completion date indicates that portions of the hull were preserved as memorials.  See the individual articles for details.

Because the program is underway, this list is almost certainly incomplete.

Note for ships marked with refit:
Sam Rayburn (SSBN-635) was converted into a training platform – Moored Training Ship (MTS-635). Sam Rayburn arrived for conversion on 1 February 1986, and on 29 July 1989 the first moored training ship achieved initial criticality. Modifications included special mooring arrangements including a mechanism to absorb power generated by the main propulsion shaft. Daniel Webster (SSBN-626) was converted to the second Moored Training Ship (MTS-2 / MTS-626) in 1993. The Moored Training Ship Site is located at Naval Weapons Station Charleston in Goose Creek, South Carolina. Sam Rayburn is scheduled to operate as an MTS until 2014 while undergoing shipyard availabilities at four-year intervals.

Notes

References 

United States Navy
Recycling in the United States
Ship disposal
Nuclear-powered ships
Ships of the United States Navy